Boje is a surname. Notable people with this surname include:

 Alexandra Bøje (born 1999), Danish badminton player
 Boje Skovhus (born 1962), Danish baritone
 Boje Postel (1890–1980), German-British painter
 Christian Due-Boje (born 1966), Swedish ice hockey player
 David Boje, American professor
 Eduard Boje (born 1969), South African cricketer
 Emil Boje Jensen (1911–1964), Danish rower
 Gabriella Bøje (born 1997), Danish badminton player
 Nicky Boje (born 1973), South African cricketer